SM UB-16 was a German Type UB I submarine or U-boat in the German Imperial Navy during World War I. The submarine was sunk by a British submarine in May 1918.

UB-16 was ordered in November 1914 and was laid down at the AG Weser shipyard in Bremen in February 1915. She carried two torpedoes for her two bow torpedo tubes and was also armed with a deck-mounted machine gun. UB-16 was broken into sections and shipped by rail to Antwerp for reassembly. She was launched in April 1915 and commissioned as SM UB-16 in May.

UB-16 spent her entire career in the Flanders Flotilla and sank 24 merchant ships, about half of them British fishing vessels. The U-boat was also responsible for sinking the new British destroyer  in 1917. In 1918, UB-16 was converted into a minelayer with the replacement of her torpedo tubes with four mine chutes. Of the 16 men on board, only UB-16s commander survived the attack.

Design and construction 
After the German Army's rapid advance along the North Sea coast in the earliest stages of World War I, the German Imperial Navy found itself without suitable submarines that could be operated in the narrow and shallow seas off Flanders. Project 34, a design effort begun in mid-August 1914, produced the Type UB I design: a small submarine that could be shipped by rail to a port of operations and quickly assembled.

UB-16 and sister boat  comprised an order of two submarines placed on 25 November from AG Weser of Bremen, a little more than three months after planning for the class began. UB-16 was laid down by Weser in Bremen on 21 February 1915. She had a single  Körting 4-cylinder diesel engine for surface travel, and a single  Siemens-Schuckert electric motor for underwater travel, both attached to a single propeller shaft.

UB-16 was armed with two  torpedoes in two bow torpedo tubes. She was also outfitted for a single  machine gun on deck. UB-16s standard complement consisted of one officer and thirteen enlisted men.

After work on UB-16 was complete at the Weser yard, she was readied for rail shipment. The process of shipping a UB I boat involved breaking the submarine down into what was essentially a knock down kit. Each boat was broken into approximately fifteen pieces and loaded onto eight railway flatcars. In early 1915, the sections of UB-16 were shipped to Antwerp for assembly in what was typically a two- to three-week process. After UB-16 was assembled and launched on 26 April, she was loaded on a barge and taken through canals to Bruges where she underwent trials.

Early career 
The submarine was commissioned into the German Imperial Navy as SM UB-16 on 12 May 1915 under the command of Oberleutnant zur See (Oblt.) Hans Valentiner, a 26-year-old first-time U-boat commander. On 1 June, UB-16 joined the Flanders Flotilla, which had been organized on 29 March. When UB-16 joined the flotilla, Germany was in the midst of its first submarine offensive, begun in February. During this campaign, enemy vessels in the German-defined war zone, which encompassed all waters around the United Kingdom, were to be sunk. Vessels of neutral countries were not to be attacked unless they definitively could be identified as enemy vessels operating under a false flag.

All three of the sunken ships were smacks—sailing vessels traditionally rigged with red ochre sails—which were stopped, boarded by crewmen from UB-16, and sunk with explosives. On 12 June, UB-16 torpedoed and sank the 3,027 GRT British cargo ship Leuctra  from the Shipwash Lightship. Nine days later, the U-boat torpedoed the British steamer Tunisiana off Lowestoft. After being hit, the 4,220 GRT ship's master beached her on Barnard Sands to save the cargo of wheat shipped from Montreal, but the ship was a complete loss. Tunisiana  was the largest ship sunk by UB-16. In her first month of action, UB-16s totals were five ships sunk of 7,432 GRT, more than half of the flotilla's June total of 14,080 tons. There were no deaths on any of UB-16s June victims.

UB-16s next two successes came on consecutive days in late July. The following day, the 1,821 GRT Mangara was torpedoed without warning one-quarter nautical mile (500 m) from the Sizewell Buoy at Aldeburgh. Eleven men died when the ship and her cargo of iron ore were sent to the bottom.

Although the Flanders Flotilla sank 31 ships in August, UB-16 did not add to that total. In a four-day span in September, however, she accounted for three of the eight ships sunk by the flotilla during the month. On the 7th, she sank two more fishing smacks, Emblem and Victorious,  from Lowestoft. On 10 September, UB-16 sank the 51 GRT Nimrod in the same vicinity.

Germany's submarine offensive was suspended on 18 September by the chief of the Admiralstab, Admiral Henning von Holtzendorff, in response to American demands after German submarines had sunk the Cunard Line steamer  in May 1915 and other high-profile sinkings in August and September. Holtzendorff's directive from ordered all U-boats out of the English Channel and the South-Western Approaches and required that all submarine activity in the North Sea be conducted strictly along prize regulations.

Second submarine offensive 
By early 1916, the British blockade of Germany was beginning to have an effect on Germany and her imports. The Royal Navy had stopped and seized more cargo destined for Germany than the quantity of cargo sunk by German U-boats in the first submarine offensive. As a result, the German Imperial Navy began a second offensive against merchant shipping on 29 February. The final ground rules agreed upon by the German Admiralstab were that all enemy vessels in Germany's self-proclaimed war zone would be destroyed without warning, that enemy vessels outside the war zone would be destroyed only if armed, and—to avoid antagonizing the United States—that enemy passenger steamers were not to be attacked, regardless of whether in the war zone or not.

Valentiner and UB-16 attacked another pair of ships in early April. The 653 GRT British ship Perth was torpedoed and sunk near Yarmouth on the 1st, while the Dutch sailing vessel Elziena Helena was sunk in an attack two days later east of Southwold.

On 5 April, Valentiner was succeeded by Kapitänleutnant Paul Hundius, a 27-year-old, first-time U-boat skipper. In the first two weeks under Hundius' command, UB-16 sank two British steamers: the 2,978 GRT Robert Adamson on the 10th, and the 3,091 GRT Tregantle on the 22nd. Robert Adamson was sunk  from the Shipwash Lightship while en route from Dundee to Le Havre with a cargo of props. Tregantle had sailed from Galveston, Texas, via Norfolk, Virginia, with a load of wheat for Hull, but was sunk off Lowestoft.

Near the end of April 1916, Admiral Reinhardt Scheer, the newest commander-in-chief of the German High Seas Fleet, called off the merchant shipping offensive and ordered all boats at sea to return, and all boats in port to remain there. UB-16 did not sink any more ships for the next eight months.

Grand Fleet ambush attempts 

In mid-May, Scheer completed plans to draw out part of the British Grand Fleet. The German High Seas Fleet would sortie for a raid on Sunderland, luring the British fleet across nests' of submarines and mine-fields". This group was to intercept and attack the British light forces from Harwich, should they sortie north to join the battle. Unfortunately for the Germans, the British Admiralty had intelligence reports of the departure of the submarines which, coupled with an absence of attacks on shipping, aroused British suspicions.

A delayed departure of the German High Seas Fleet for its sortie (which had been redirected to the Skagerrak) and the failure of several of the U-boats stationed to the north to receive the coded message warning of the British advance caused Scheer's anticipated ambush to be a "complete and disappointing failure". In UB-16s group, only UB-10 sighted the Harwich forces, and they were too far away to mount an attack. The failure of the submarine ambush to sink any British capital ships allowed the full Grand Fleet to engage the numerically inferior High Seas Fleet in the Battle of Jutland, which took place 31 May – 1 June.

UB-16s activities over the next two months are not reported, but on 2 August the submarine was patrolling off the Mass Lightship and torpedoed the Norwegian steamer John Wilson, sending her cargo of food destined for London to the bottom. Later in August, Scheer set up another ambush for the British fleet, when he drew up plans for another High Seas Fleet raid on Sunderland (as had been the original intention in May). The German fleet planned to depart late in the day on 18 August and shell military targets the next morning. As in May, UB-16 was part of a group intended to attack the Harwich forces. As one of five boats forming the second line of boats from the Flanders Flotilla, UB-16 was stationed off Texel by the morning of 20 August. Once again, British intelligence had given warning of the impending attack and ambush, causing the Grand Fleet to sortie at 16:00 on 18 August, five hours before the German fleet sailed. Faulty intelligence caused Scheer initially to divert from Sunderland, and then to eventually call off the whole operation. Although U-boats to the north sank two British light cruisers, UB-16 and her group played no part in the action.

Later, on 24 August, UB-16 was again patrolling off the Mass Lightship when Hundius stopped Velox, another Norwegian steamer headed for London. Crewmen from UB-16 boarded the 312 GRT cargo ship, planted explosives, and sank the vessel and her general cargo. Velox was the last ship sunk by the UB-16 for nearly eight months, and the last sunk by Hundius before he was replaced by Oblt. Ernst Müller-Schwarz late in the month. Neither Müller-Schwartz, nor his January 1917 replacement, Oblt. Hans Ewald Niemer, sank any ships while in command of UB-16.

Unrestricted submarine warfare 
By the time of the so-called "turnip winter" of 1916–17, the Royal Navy blockade of Germany had severely limited imports of food and fuel into Germany. Among the results were an increase in infant mortality and as many as 700,000 deaths attributed to starvation or hypothermia during the war. With the blockade having such dire consequences, Kaiser Wilhelm II personally approved a resumption of unrestricted submarine warfare to begin on 1 February 1917 to help force the British to make peace. The new rules of engagement specified that no ship was to be left afloat.

With the new campaign already underway, Niemer was replaced as UB-16s commander by Oblt. Hugo Thielmann on 18 March. Although only in command of UB-16 for little more than a month, Thielmann sank one ship on UB-16. The 107 GRT Dutch motor vessel Arie was sunk in the Hoofden area on 20 April; there were no reports of casualties.

Kapitänleutnant Wilhelm Rhein was assigned to UB-16 on 23 April, and under his command, UB-16 may have been responsible for damaging the Norwegian cargo ship Kongsli on 26 April.

On 9 August, UB-16 torpedoed and sank the British destroyer   from the North Hinder Lightship. Recruit, commissioned four months earlier, sank with 54 of her complement. Rhein was succeeded by Oblt. Günther Bachmann on 26 August, and he, in turn, was succeeded by Oblt. Alfred Krameyer on 25 December.

Conversion to minelayer 

UB-16 and three sister boats, UB-10, UB-12, and UB-17, had all been converted to minelaying submarines by 1918. The conversion involved removing the bow section containing the pair of torpedo tubes from each U-boat and replacing it with a new bow containing four mine chutes capable of carrying two mines each. Exactly when this conversion was performed on UB-16 is not reported, but UB-12 was at the dockyard from November 1916 to January 1917. The lack of reported successes by UB-16 during this same span makes it a possibility that her conversion was accomplished in a similar timeframe.

On 13 March, UB-16, now under the command of Oblt. Rudolf Stier, was responsible for sinking the 895 GRT steamer Lisette near the Shipwash Lightship. One month later, on 13 April, the fishing smack Ruth was boarded and sunk by UB-16; Ruth was the final ship sunk by UB-16.

On 28 April, British forces attempted to block the canal at Zeebrugge and bottle up the vessels of the Flanders Flotilla in the Zeebrugge Raid. British admiral Roger Keyes, who had planned the raid, believed that the Flanders Flotilla ships were bottled up for a long period of time. However, the following day, after the Germans had removed two piers, UB-16—under Oblt. Vicco von der Lühe, her newest commander—made the first sortie from Zeebrugge after the raid.

Sinking 
UB-16 departed Zeebrugge for what would be the final time on 6 May 1918 for a patrol off Harwich. At 18:50 on 10 May, the British submarine  spotted UB-16 on the surface near Harwich. Although E34s commanding officer Lieutenant Pulleyne initially believed that UB-16 was a British submarine, he submerged out of caution because of UB-16s proximity to Harwich. After identifying the submarine as a German boat, Pulleyne maneuvered to attack. The first hit UB-16s bow and failed to detonate, but the second hit below the conning tower and exploded, sinking UB-16 at position  in less than five minutes. After a further five minutes, E34 surfaced near where UB-16 had gone down, and rescued von der Lühe from the oily water; he was the only survivor. Von der Lühe was imprisoned in a British prisoner of war camp, where he died of influenza on 1 March 1919. British divers dispatched to the site of UB-16s demise a week later could only find some plating and a few pipes and concluded that UB-16 had disintegrated after the torpedo hit.

Summary of raiding history

Notes

References

Bibliography 

 

 
 
 
 
 
 
 
 
 

German Type UB I submarines
Ships built in Bremen (state)
Ships built in Belgium
U-boats commissioned in 1915
World War I submarines of Germany
U-boats sunk by British submarines
World War I shipwrecks in the North Sea
U-boats sunk in 1918
Ships lost with all hands